Wall lizard may refer to:

 Any lizard in the family Lacertidae
 More specifically, any lizard in the genus Podarcis
 More specifically than that, the species Podarcis muralis

Animal common name disambiguation pages